The Natkusiak flood basalts are a sequence of Neoproterozoic continental flood basalts of the Franklin Large Igneous Province on Victoria Island, Canada. The flood basalts were erupted about 720 million years ago after uplift began three to five million years prior to the flood basalt volcanism. This uplift and flood basalt volcanism was caused by a mantle plume. This flood basalt sequence is related to the Franklin magmatic event.

See also
Volcanism of Northern Canada

References
Large Igneous Provinces and the Mantle Plume Hypothesis
Nature and timing of Franklin igneous events, Canada : implications for a Late Proterozoic mantle plume and the break-up of Laurentia

Volcanism of the Northwest Territories
Neoproterozoic volcanism
Flood basalts
Hotspot volcanism